Stine House may refer to:

L.L. Stine House, in Woodward, Oklahoma, listed on the National Register of Historic Places (NRHP)
Stine House, predecessor to Dacres Hotel in Walla Walla, Washington

See also
Stine and McClure Undertaking Company Building, Kansas City, Missouri, NRHP-listed
Stine Building, Alva, Oklahoma, NRHP-listed
Stein House (disambiguation)